"Under the Weather" is a 2005 rock song by KT Tunstall.

Under the weather may also refer to:
 "Under the Weather" (short story), a 2011 short story by Stephen King
 Under the Weather (1997 film), a Canadian animated short movie
 Under the Weather (2020 film),a Canadian drama film
 Malaise, a vague, generalized feeling of being sick